Dato' Sri Dr. Wee Jeck Seng (born 20 April 1964) is a Malaysian politician who has served as the Member of Parliament (MP) for Tanjung Piai from March 2008 to May 2018 and again since November 2019. He is a member of the Malaysian Chinese Association (MCA), a component party of the Barisan Nasional (BN) coalition who served as the Deputy Minister of Plantation Industries and Commodities I for the second term in the BN administration under former Prime Minister Ismail Sabri Yaakob and former Minister Zuraida Kamaruddin from August 2021 to the collapse of the BN administration in November 2022 and the first term in the Perikatan Nasional (PN) administration under former Prime Minister Muhyiddin Yassin and former Minister Khairuddin Razali from March 2020 to the collapse of the PN administration in August 2021, Deputy Minister of Youth and Sports in the BN administration under former Prime Ministers Abdullah Ahmad Badawi and Najib Razak as well as former Ministers Ismail Sabri Yaakob and  Ahmad Shabery Cheek from March 2008 to his defeat in the 2010 MCA leadership election in June 2010 and Member of the Johor State Legislative Assembly (MLA) for Pekan Nanas from March 2004 to March 2008 as well as Chairman of the Labuan Port Authority (LPA) from March 2017 to June 2018.

Background 
Wee was born on 20 April 1964 at his hometown in Pontian, Johor. He is married to Lin Ruyun. He graduated with Bachelor of Business Management from the University of Sunderland. Wee received his Doctorate in Public Management from Universiti Utara Malaysia in 2019.

Political career 
Wee was first elected as member of the Johor State Legislative Assembly for Pekan Nanas constituency for one term from 2004 to 2008. Prior to Wee's election, he was MCA president Ong Ka Ting's political secretary. Wee was elected to federal Parliament in the 2008 general election for the seat of Tanjong Piai. Wee was nominated for the seat by MCA after it was vacated by Ong to contest  Kulai seat.

Immediately after his election to the Dewan Rakyat, Parliament in 2008, Wee was appointed as a Deputy Minister of Youth and Sports in the government of prime minister Abdullah Ahmad Badawi. He retained his appointment when incoming prime minister Najib Razak reshuffled the ministry in April 2009. However, he was dropped from the ministry in June 2010 following MCA leadership elections.

Wee won and retained his Tanjong Piai parliamentary seat in the 2013 general election but lost his parliamentary seat to Mohamed Farid Md Rafik from the Malaysian United Indigenous Party (BERSATU) of Pakatan Harapan (PH) in the 2018 general election.

In November 2019, Wee managed to return as an opposition MP for Tanjung Piai after he was chosen by the BN as their candidate again to contest the 2019 Tanjung Piai by-election set-upon by the sudden death of incumbent Mohamed Farid and won the six-cornered polls with a landslide majority of 15,086 votes.

Controversy
In the 2019 Tanjung Piai by-election campaigning time where Wee was a candidate then, he was accused of wasting public funds recklessly during his term as Labuan Port Authority (LPA) chairman from 2017 to 2018 by his successor Chan Foong Hin. It was disclosed under Wee, the LPA had committed to a three-year tenancy for an office at Menara UOA, in Bangsar, Kuala Lumpur which was never occupied that would amount to RM526,836.96 and had splurged on its renovations included a high-tech toilet with auto/smart toilet bowl, in which the bill came up to RM343,180.50.

Election results

Honours 
  :
  Companion Class I of the Exalted Order of Malacca (DMSM) - Datuk (2009)
  :
  Grand Knight of the Order of Sultan Ahmad Shah of Pahang (SSAP) - Dato' Sri (2016)

External links

References 

Living people
1964 births
People from Johor
Malaysian politicians of Chinese descent
Malaysian Chinese Association politicians
Members of the Dewan Rakyat
Members of the Johor State Legislative Assembly
21st-century Malaysian politicians